Al Stillman (né Albert Irving Silverman; 26 June 1901 Manhattan, New York – 17 February 1979 Manhattan, New York) was an American lyricist.

Biography
Stillman was born to Jewish parents Herman Silverman and Gertrude Rubin (maiden). He adopted the name "Albert Stillman" as a professional pseudonym. He chose the name, reportedly, because it was the recognizable surname of a well-known New York banking family. He was Jewish. He attended New York University. After graduation, he contributed to Franklin P. Adams' newspaper column, and in 1933 became a staff writer at Radio City Music Hall, a position he held for almost 40 years.

Stillman collaborated with a number of composers: Fred Ahlert, Robert Allen, Percy Faith, George Gershwin, Ernesto Lecuona, Paul McGrane, Kay Swift, and Arthur Schwartz. Many of his collaborations with Allen were major hits in the 1950s for The Four Lads; the Stillman/Allen team also wrote hit songs for Perry Como and Johnny Mathis.

Stillman was inducted into the Songwriters Hall of Fame in 1982.

Songs for which Stillman wrote lyrics

Music by Robert Allen

Perry Como hits 
"Home for the Holidays" (1954) (Still played during the Christmas holiday.)
"My One and Only Heart" (1953)
"You Alone (Solo Tu)"  (1953, redone in 1961)

Four Lads hits 
"Enchanted Island" (1958)
"Moments to Remember" (1955)
"No, Not Much" (1956)
"There’s Only One of You" (1958)
"Who Needs You?" (1956)

Johnny Mathis hits
"Chances Are" (1957)
"It's Not For Me to Say" (1957)
"Teacher, Teacher" (1958)

Music by Ernesto Lecuona 
"The Breeze and I" (1940)
"In Spain They Say ‘Si Si’" (co-written with Francia Luban)
"You're the One" as recorded by Kathy Kirby in 1964

Others
"Air Cadet Song (music by Louis E.De Francesco, 1944 (published by Sam Fox Pub Co. NY NY)
"Alley Cat" (music by Bent Fabric)
"And That Reminds Me" (or "My Heart Reminds Me") (written with Camillo Bargoni, Dante Panzuti, and Paul Siegel.)  (A hit for singers Vikki Carr, Kay Starr, Julie London, Della Reese, Dean Martin, among others.)
"Bless 'em All" (with Fred Godfrey, Frank Kerslake, and James Lally) (a World War II song)
"Can You Find It in Your Heart"
"Don'cha Go 'Way Mad" (music by Jimmy Mundy.) (A hit for Frank Sinatra.)
"Every Step of the Way"
"The Great Escape March"
"Happy Anniversary"
"I Believe" (1952) (written with Ervin Drake, Irvin Graham, and Jimmy Shirl) (a hit for Jane Froman, Frankie Laine, and recorded by many others, including Perry Como, Barbra Streisand, Cissy Houston, and Elvis Presley.)
"If Dreams Come True"
"I Love You and Don’t You Forget It" (1963) (music by Henry Mancini) (A hit for Perry Como.)
"Jukebox Saturday Night" (1942) (music by Paul McGrane) (A hit for the Glenn Miller Orchestra and the Pied Pipers vocal group.)
"The Little Boy"
"Little Jack Frost Get Lost" (written with Seger Ellis [1904-95])
"Mama Yo Quiero" (written with Jararaca and Vincente Paiva.) (A hit for the Xavier Cugat Orchestra and others.)
"Meantime"
"An Old Flame Never Dies"
"One, Two, Three, Kick"
"A Room with a View"
"Song About Love"
"Taboo"
"Tell Me That You Love Me Tonight"
"There's Nothing I Can Say"
"Truly, Truly True"
"When I Am With You", (music by Benjamin Weisman.) (A hit for Johnny Mathis.)
"You and I Know"
"Turn Off the Moon" (sung by Sue Lyon, music by Bob Harris.)
"Copacabana"

Stage shows with scores by Stillman
Howdy
Icetime of 1948
It Happens on Ice
Mr. Ice
Stars on Ice
Virginia

Movies to which Stillman contributed songs
The Cardinal
Captains of the Clouds (1942)  (Was uncredited, but wrote the song "Bless Em All")
Carnival in Costa Rica (1947) (Wrote the songs "Costa Rica" and "Say Si Si")
I'll Cry Tomorrow (1955) (Film used his song "Cui Cui," originally written for The Long, Long Trailer.)
Lizzie (1957) (Composed the song "It's Not For Me To Say")
The Long, Long Trailer (1954) (Composed the song "Cui Cui")
The FBI Story (1959) (Composed the song "What Do I Care?")

Family 
Stillman, on September 29, 1939, married Pauline Reinfmann (née Patia Reinfmann aka Kaufman; 1906–1990) in Fort Lee, New Jersey. She was born in Russia and became a U.S. naturalized citizen March 22, 1943, in the U.S. District Court for the Southern District of New York. Pauline's sister, Anna "Billie" Swan (née Anna Kaufman; 1905–1992), married, on August 7, 1925, in Manhattan to Einar Aaron Swan (1903–1940), an arranger and composer.

References

External links

1901 births
1979 deaths
American lyricists
Jewish American musicians
Jewish American songwriters
Musicians from New York City
20th-century American musicians
Songwriters from New York (state)
20th-century American Jews